Eunoe serrata is a scale worm described from the South Atlantic Ocean off the coast of Brazil at depths down to about 200m.

Description
Number of segments 30; elytra 15 pairs. Prostomium anterior margin comprising a pair of acute anterior projections. Lateral antennae inserted ventrally (beneath prostomium and median antenna). Notochaetae distinctly thicker than neurochaetae. Bidentate neurochaetae absent.

References

Phyllodocida